Charles Julien Brianchon (19 December 1783 – 29 April 1864) was a French mathematician and chemist.

Life
He entered into the École Polytechnique in 1804 at the age of eighteen, and studied under Monge, graduating first in his class in 1808, after which he took up a career as a lieutenant in Napoleon's artillery. Later, in 1818, Brianchon became a professor in the Artillery School of the Royal Guard at Vincennes.

Work
Brianchon is best known for his proof of Brianchon's theorem (1810).

Brianchon's book Mémoire sur les lignes du second ordre (Paris, 1817) is available online .

External links
Brianchon's Theorem
 

19th-century French mathematicians
École Polytechnique alumni
1783 births
1864 deaths
People from Sèvres